Physalia is a genus of the order Siphonophorae, colonies of four specialized polyps and medusoids that drift on the surface of the Atlantic, Indian and Pacific oceans. Although these organisms look like a single multicellular organism, each specimen is actually a colony of minute organisms called zooids that have to work together for survival. A gas-filled bladder resembling a blue bottle provides buoyancy, and long tentacles of venomous cnidocytes provide a means of capturing prey. A sail on the float, which may be left or right-handed, propels Physalia about the sea, often in groups. These siphonophores sometimes become stranded on beaches, where their toxic nematocysts can remain potent for weeks or months in moist conditions. Both species of this siphonophore resemble a jellyfish in appearance, with their gas-filled float and cluster of polyps beneath, which can hang up to 30 or 165 feet below the surface of the sea.

The species Physalia utriculus is given the common name Pacific man o' war to distinguish it from the more widely distributed and larger Physalia physalis, the Portuguese man o' war. The species are told apart by the size of the float (six inches compared to twelve) and by having a single versus several long fishing tentacles. No fatalities from envenomation are recorded for P. utriculus, in contrast to the larger species.

Because it frequently washes up on beaches on the coast of the Atlantic, Indian and Pacific Oceans and is seen in the open ocean, Physalia is the best-known genus of siphonophore, as nearly all siphonophores live in the cold, dark ocean depths where they can only be observed in their natural habitat by a submersible or ROV.

The genus was first described by Jean-Baptiste Lamarck in 1801.

Diversity
The family Physaliidae is monotypic, consisting of only one genus, Physalia. The genus contains only two species.

References

Siphonophorae
Taxa named by Jean-Baptiste Lamarck
Cnidarian genera